Bjørg Tysdal Moe (born 6 March 1954) is a Norwegian politician for the Christian Democratic Party.

She served as a deputy representative to the Parliament of Norway from Rogaland during the term 2005–2009. She is also the deputy mayor of Stavanger, and since 2008 the deputy leader of the Norwegian Association of Local and Regional Authorities.

References

1954 births
Living people
Norwegian Christians
Politicians from Stavanger
Deputy members of the Storting
Christian Democratic Party (Norway) politicians
Women members of the Storting